The Barbarian is a 1920 American silent drama film directed by Donald Crisp and starring Monroe Salisbury and George Berrell. It is based upon a short story by Theodore Seixas Solomons.

Plot
As described in a film magazine, Eric (Salisbury) is brought up in the Canadian north woods by his reclusive father Elliott Straive (Berrell), who was a college professor. The boy supplements his immense knowledge of nature with book learning of society and polite customs. A party of ultra-rich people led by James Heatherton (Sherry) arrive and camp on the land, building a tent city for their luxurious convenience. Their object is to obtain possession of the land by means fair or foul. Eric frustrates their plans but falls in love with Floria (Novak), the daughter of the land grabber. The failure of the rich to embarrass Eric using sham etiquette is humorous, and there is a fight between Eric and Mark Brant (Hale), a man from the party who comes closest to being a "heavy" of the film.

Cast
Monroe Salisbury as Eric Straive
George Berrell as Elliott Straive
J. Barney Sherry as James Heatherton
Elinor Hancock as Mrs. Heatherton	 
Jane Novak as Floria Heatherton	 
Anne Cudahy as Sylvia Heatherton
Michael Cudahy as Roswell Heatherton 
Alan Hale, Sr. as Mark Brant
Milton Markwell as Mainhall 
Lillian Leighton as Redwing

Production
Much of The Barbarian was filmed in California's Castle Lake district with Mount Shasta in the background.

References

External links

1920 films
1920 drama films
Films directed by Donald Crisp
American silent feature films
American black-and-white films
Silent American drama films
Films based on short fiction
1920s American films
1920s English-language films